Events from the year 1645 in Spain.

Incumbents
Monarch: Philip IV

Events

Births

Deaths
September 8 - Francisco de Quevedo, nobleman, politician and writer (born 1580)
December 28 - Gaspar de Borja y Velasco (born 1580)

 
1640s in Spain
Years of the 17th century in Spain